Yuriy Voronkin (born 18 May 1979) is a Russian hammer thrower. His personal best throw is 78.69 metres, achieved in June 2003 in Tula.

He won the silver medal at the 1998 World Junior Championships. On senior level he competed at the 2004 Olympic Games without reaching the final.

Achievements

External links 

1979 births
Living people
Russian male hammer throwers
Athletes (track and field) at the 2004 Summer Olympics
Olympic athletes of Russia